Barbara Zima (born 14 January 2000) is a Polish handballer for Zagłębie Lubin and the Polish national team.

She participated at the 2021 World Women's Handball Championship in Spain, placing 15th.

References

External links

2000 births
Living people
People from Warsaw
Polish female handball players
21st-century Polish women